Nosher may refer to:

Nosher Powell, English actor and boxer
Gunner "Nosher" Evans, a character in the It Ain't Half Hot Mum comedy series

See also
 Nosh (disambiguation)